Udea gigantalis is a moth in the family Crambidae. It was described by Paul Dognin in 1912. It is found in Colombia.

References

Moths described in 1912
gigantalis